Ayrlies Garden is a country garden near Whitford, southeast of Auckland on the North Island of New Zealand.  It is one of New Zealand's best-known gardens, and has been described as the "quintessential New Zealand garden". The New Zealand Gardens Trust has rated it a six star garden, its highest rating.

Some areas feature roses, clematis and perennials; others contain lush, sub-tropical plants, such as Petrea, Alocasia, bromeliads, vireya rhododendrons and Ficus dammaropsis. It contains several structures around the main house, including a small 'sitooterie' - a low gazebo, to sit out in and admire the view. The large site is unified by a consistent planting and use of materials.

The garden was created by Beverly McConnell and her late husband Malcolm, co-founder of New Zealand engineering and construction company McConnell Dowell. It is named after Malcolm McConnell's grandfather's farm in Scotland. From 2000,  of swamp flats below the homestead were transformed into a wetland area with an  lake, linking the garden to the Hauraki Gulf nearby.

The garden is open to the public on weekdays, for a fee.

References

External links

Ayrlies Garden

Gardens in the Auckland Region
Tourist attractions in the Auckland Region